Santa Juana Formation a Late Triassic (Carnian stage) sedimentary rock formation near Santa Juana in the lower course of the Biobío River in south-central Chile. Lithologies range from conglomerate sandstone, arkosic sandstone, siltstone and mudstone.

Description 
The sediments that consolidate into the rocks of the formation deposited in alluvial, fluvial, lacustrine and playa lake environment. Overall, the formation is rich in plant fossils.

The formation was deposited over the rocks of the Coastal Batholith of central Chile in a sedimentary basin that formed along the Gastre Fault. It has been posited that the basin developed as a rift during the early break-up of Gondwana in the Triassic.

Fossil content 
The following fossils have been reported from the formation:

Flora 

 Asterotheca fuchsii
 A. rigbyana
 Baiera africana
 B. furcata
 Cladophlebis mendozaensis
 Dicroidium coriaceum
 D. crassinervis
 D. elongatum
 D. odontopteroides
 Dictyophyllum fuenzalidai
 D. tenuifolium
 Gleichenites quilacoyensis
 Gontriglossa reinerae
 Heidiphyllum elongatum
 Kurtziana cacheutensis
 Linguifolium lilleanum
 L. steinmannii
 Pterophyllum santajuanensis
 Rissikia media
 Saportaea dichotoma
 Sphenobaiera africana
 Sphenopteris cf. polymorpha
 Taeniopteris sp.
 Taeniopteris vittata
 Telemachus elongatus
 Thaumatopteris rothii
 Todites chilensis
 cf. Pseudoctenis fissa
 Cladophlebis sp.
 Dicroidium sp.
 Gleichenites sp.
 ?Antevsia sp.

Insects 

 Bandelnielsenia chilena
 Ischichucasyne santajuanaensis
 Ademosyne sp.

Branchiopoda 
 Polygrapta troncosoi
 Menucoestheria terneraensis

See also 

 Chañares Formation, fossiliferous formation of the Ischigualasto-Villa Unión Basin, Argentina
 Candelária Formation, contemporaneous fossiliferous formation of the Paraná Basin, Brazil
 Molteno Formation, contemporaneous fossiliferous formation of Lesotho and South Africa
 Pebbly Arkose Formation, contemporaneous fossiliferous formation of Botswana, Zambia and Zimbabwe
 Denmark Hill Insect Bed, contemporaneous fossiliferous unit of Queensland, Australia
 Madygen Formation, contemporaneous Lagerstätte of Kyrgyzstan

References

Bibliogahy 
 
  
 

Geologic formations of Chile
Triassic System of South America
Late Triassic South America
Carnian Stage
Triassic Chile
Sandstone formations
Siltstone formations
Conglomerate formations
Alluvial deposits
Fluvial deposits
Lacustrine deposits
Paleontology in Chile
Geology of Biobío Region